Charles John Poul Mwijage is a Tanzanian CCM politician and Member of Parliament for Muleba North constituency since 2010. He served as the Minister of Industries, Trade and Investment in the Cabinet of Tanzania.

On November 10, 2018 he was dismissed by President John Magufuli on grounds of under-performance.

References

Living people
Chama Cha Mapinduzi MPs
Tanzanian MPs 2010–2015
Tanzanian MPs 2015–2020
Tanzanian MPs 2020–2025
1960 births
Tanzanian Roman Catholics